Brought to Light: Thirty Years of Drug Smuggling, Arms Deals, and Covert Action is an anthology of two political graphic novels, published originally by Eclipse Comics in 1988.

The two stories are Shadowplay: The Secret Team by Alan Moore and Bill Sienkiewicz, and Flashpoint: The LA Penca Bombing documented by Martha Honey and Tony Avirgan and adapted by Joyce Brabner and Tom Yeates. Brought to Light was edited overall by Joyce Brabner, Catherine Yronwode acted as executive editor, and Eclipse publisher Dean Mullaney was the publication designer. Both stories were based upon research by the Christic Institute, who initiated the work.

Shadowplay: The Secret Team
Shadowplay: The Secret Team was written by Alan Moore and drawn by Bill Sienkiewicz, with an introduction by Daniel Sheehan (general counsel of TCI).  It covers the history of the Central Intelligence Agency and its involvement in the Vietnam War, the Iran-Contra affair, and its relationship with figures like Augusto Pinochet and Manuel Noriega.  The narrator of Shadowplay is an aging anthropomorphic American Eagle, a bellicose, retired CIA agent.

There were rumors that Moore was unable to travel to America due to the CIA being annoyed at his story in Brought to Light. However, the real reason was Moore not renewing his passport.

The story of "Shadowplay" is of an unseen character in a bar, where he is approached by a man-sized, walking, talking eagle. The eagle, from the emblem of the CIA, proceeds to drink alcohol and, in a drunken stupor, divulge all the details of The Agency's past. Early on a reference is made to the number of gallons an Olympic swimming pool can hold, and the fact that an adult human body has one gallon of blood; from then on, the victims of CIA activities (directly or indirectly) are quantified in swimming pools filled with blood, with each pool representing 20,000 dead.

Shadowplay spoken word
Shadowplay was made into a spoken word performance with Alan Moore and released on an audio compact disc by Codex Books in 1998. The narrative for the production is performed by Moore himself, in character, set to music by the composer Gary Lloyd who also collaborated on a similar narrative/music performance piece with Scottish author Iain Banks.

Flashpoint: The LA Penca Bombing
Flashpoint: The LA Penca Bombing is written by Joyce Brabner, as told to her by Christic Institute clients Martha Honey and Tony Avirgan.  It deals with the La Penca bombing which happened during the civil war in Nicaragua in 1984.

Credits for "Flashpoint" list Jonathan Marshall for the introduction, Joyce Brabner writing, and Thomas Yeates illustrating, with letters by Bill Pearson and painting by Sam Parsons. Martha Honey and Tony Avirgan are credited with having told the story to Joyce Brabner.

"30 Years of Covert War"
In the center is a two-page feature by Paul Mavrides, "World Map of 30 Years of Covert Action" detailing what the Christic Institute purported to be election tampering, drug trafficking, assassination, and other crimes committed by the CIA.

References

External links
 Full text at Internet Archive
 Shadowplay: The Secret Team
 Flashpoint: The La Penca Bombing
[http://www.blather.net/articles/amoore/brought_to_light1.html Alan Moore discusses Brought to Light]
Codex Books listing of the CD
Alan Moore interview at The Idler''

1988 comics debuts
Non-fiction comics
Non-fiction graphic novels
Comics publications
Eclipse Comics titles